Hélène Lee is a French journalist who specialises in Jamaican and West African music.

She started as a journalist in 1979 for Libération and was one of the first to defend the world music in France.

Her early works on African artists helped establish artist like Salif Keita, Alpha Blondy, Ray Lema or Tiken Jah Fakoly.
She has published different books related to the Jamaican culture contributing to the development of the reggae music in France and is considered as an expert of the Rasta culture.
Other works include documentaries and translations.

She took her name after her wedding with a rasta from Negril, Joseph Lee.

Bibliography

External links
Trailer for Helene's Lee upcoming documentary about the First Rasta
interview in French on her book Voir Trenchtown et mourir

French music critics
French women critics
French journalists
Reggae journalists
Year of birth missing (living people)
Living people
French women journalists
Women writers about music